The Laramie, North Park and Western Railroad was a railroad in the U.S. states of Wyoming and Colorado between Laramie, Wyoming and Coalmont, Colorado.  It operated under several different names between 1901 and 1951 prior to absorption by the Union Pacific Railroad.

History 

The railroad was established in 1901 as the Laramie, Hahns Peak and Pacific Railway Company by Issac Van Horn, who planned to construct the line to the mining camps near Gold Hill in the Snowy Range west of Laramie. Under the auspices of the Acme Consolidated Gold & Mining Company the partners constructed a sawmill, lumber yard, newspaper and other improvements. Fighting financial issues, the railroad did not arrive in Centennial until 1907 after mining operations in the Snowy Range has mostly died out.

The company opted to go south to North Park in Colorado.  The company bought part of a coal deposit near Walden, Colorado and named it Coalmont.  The first train reached Walden in October, 1911 and Coalmont in December.  The line was very difficult and expensive to operate during winter.  In 1914 the company was unable to pay its mortgage and the Colorado, Wyoming and Eastern Railroad took control of the line.  In April 1924 the line was sold to new owners that renamed it the Northern Colorado and Eastern Railroad Company.  The citizens in Laramie requested the name of the town be in the line, so in June it was renamed again as Laramie, North Park and Western Railroad. David Webster Adamson retired as general superintendent of the Laramie, North Park and Western railroad on June 1, 1941.

The line continued to struggle through the 1930s, and the Interstate Commerce Commission urged Union Pacific to take over.  In 1935 the UP acquired control of the LNP&W, and Union Pacific ran the line under the LNP&W name until 1951 when the companies merged, the line becoming the Coalmont Branch of the Union Pacific, and the LNP&W depot in Laramie was closed. Shortline Wyoming Colorado Railroad bought the line in 1987, and subsequently abandoned it in Summer of 1999.

See also 
List of defunct Colorado railroads
List of defunct Wyoming railroads

References

External links

Defunct Wyoming railroads
Historic American Engineering Record in Wyoming
Predecessors of the Union Pacific Railroad
Railway companies established in 1924
Railway companies disestablished in 1951
Defunct Colorado railroads
American companies disestablished in 1951
American companies established in 1924